Áron Dobos (born 8 June 2000) is a Hungarian professional footballer. He plays as a forward for Szeged-Csanád.

Club career
Dobos began his senior footballing career with his local club Dunaújváros in the Hungarian Nemzeti Bajnokság III. After scoring 25 goals in 48 games, Dobos transferred to Fortuna Sittard in the Netherlands on 4 July 2018. Dobos made his professional debut with Fortuna Sittard in a 5–1 Eredivisie loss to De Graafschap on 20 January 2019.

International career
Dobos is a youth international for Hungary. He represented the Hungary U17s in a two friendlies against the Wales U17s in 2016, scoring twice.

Personal life
Dobos' father, Barna Dobos, is a Hungarian football manager.

References

External links

HLSZ Profile

Fortuna Sittard Profile

2000 births
Living people
Sportspeople from Dunaújváros
Hungarian footballers
Hungarian expatriate footballers
Hungary youth international footballers
Association football forwards
Fehérvár FC players
MTK Budapest FC players
Dunaújváros PASE players
Fortuna Sittard players
Győri ETO FC players
Szeged-Csanád Grosics Akadémia footballers
Eredivisie players
Hungarian expatriate sportspeople in the Netherlands
Expatriate footballers in the Netherlands
21st-century Hungarian people